Live attenuated influenza vaccine (LAIV) is a type of influenza vaccine in the form of a nasal spray that is recommended for the prevention of influenza.

It is an attenuated vaccine, unlike most influenza vaccines, which are inactivated vaccines. LAIV is administered intranasally, while inactivated vaccines are administered by intramuscular injection.  LAIV is sold under the brand name FluMist Quadrivalent in the United States and the brand name Fluenz Tetra in the European Union. FluMist was first introduced in 2003 by MedImmune.

Medical uses
The live attenuated influenza vaccine is used to provide protection against the flu caused by infection with influenza viruses.

Contraindications
The use of the live attenuated influenza vaccine is contraindicated, and should therefore not be used, in the following populations:
 children <24 months of age, due to increased risk of wheezing
 individuals with a history of hypersensitivity to previous influenza vaccination.
 individuals with a history of hypersensitivity, especially anaphylactic reactions, to eggs, egg proteins, gentamicin, gelatin, or arginine or to any other ingredient in the formulation 
 People with a medical condition that places them at high risk for complications from influenza, including those with chronic heart or lung disease, such as asthma or reactive airways disease
 People with medical conditions such as diabetes or kidney failure or people with illnesses that weaken the immune system, or who take medications that can weaken the immune system
 Children less than 5 years old with a history of recurrent wheezing
 Children or adolescents receiving aspirin
 People with a history of Guillain–Barré syndrome, a rare disorder of the nervous system
 Pregnant women
 People who have a severe allergy to chicken eggs or who are allergic to any of the nasal spray vaccine components

Production
The live attenuated vaccine is based on a flu strain that does not cause disease, that replicates well at relatively cold temperatures (about 25 °C, for incubation purposes), and replicates poorly at body temperature (which minimizes risk to humans). Genes that code for surface proteins (targeted antigens) are combined with this host using genetic reassortment from strains that are projected to be circulating widely in the coming months. The resulting viruses are then incubated in chicken eggs and chick kidney cells. To make the refrigerated version, the virus is purified in centrifuges through a sucrose gradient, then packaged with sucrose, phosphate, glutamate, arginine, and gelatin made from pigs that has been hydrolyzed with acid.

Risks
Even though the virus in the live attenuated influenza vaccine is attenuated (low in virulence), it is still a living virus, and may cause an infection with complications in people with weakened immune systems or other underlying medical conditions. The live attenuated influenza vaccine is recommended only for people 2–49 years of age, and people who have a weakened immune system, pregnant women, and people with certain chronic diseases may not be eligible to receive LAIV. In contrast, inactivated virus vaccines contain no living virus, and cannot cause a live infection. Persons receiving the live attenuated influenza vaccine may shed small amounts of the vaccine virus during the first week. People coming in contact with the vaccinated person are not considered to be at risk, unless their immune systems are severely weakened (for example, bone marrow transplant recipients) and possible recombination with other (wild or live vaccine) flu strains.

History

The live attenuated influenza vaccine was originally developed by the University of Michigan School of Public Health in Ann Arbor, Michigan and later by Aviron, in Mountain View, California, under the sponsorship of the National Institutes of Health (NIH) in the 1990s. MedImmune, Inc. purchased Aviron in 2002, and the US Food and Drug Administration (FDA) approved the live attenuated influenza vaccine in June 2003.

The FDA initially approved the live attenuated influenza vaccine only for healthy people aged 5 to 49 because of concerns over possible side effects. The live attenuated influenza vaccine is approved and recommended for healthy children 24 months of age and older. The FDA approved the unfrozen refrigerated version for the same age group (ages 5–49) in August 2006, following completion of phase III clinical trials.

The cold-adapted influenza vaccine version of the vaccine is called CAIV-T, and is stable for storage in a refrigerator, rather than requiring freezer storage as did the originally-approved formulation. Approved for the 2007-2008 flu season, the refrigerated formulation can be distributed more economically, so that the price differential with shots (which had hampered sales of the original frozen version of FluMist) is now largely eliminated. FluMist was initially priced higher than the injectable vaccines, but sold only 500,000 of the four million doses it produced its first year on the market, despite a comparative shortage of flu vaccine in fall 2004. The price was sharply lowered the next year, and the company reported distributing 1.6 million doses in 2005. Because of the price drop, despite selling almost three times as many doses in 2005, the company reported $21 million in FluMist sales, compared to $48 million the previous year. Further cuts in pricing had to await FDA approval of a refrigerator-cooled FluMist formulation, as the initial formulation required freezer storage and thawing on demand before administration. Although it is positioned as a premium product, the remaining price premium for FluMist over the cost of needle-injected vaccine is small.

Society and culture

MedImmune is one company that manufactures the live attenuated influenza vaccine, which it sells under the brand name FluMist in the United States and the brand name Fluenz Tetra in the European Union. For the 2010–2011 flu season, FluMist was the only live attenuated influenza vaccine approved by the FDA for use in the US. All other FDA-approved lots were inactivated virus vaccines. In September 2009 a LAIV intranasal vaccine for the novel H1N1 influenza virus was approved and the seasonal intranasal vaccine was approved by the European Medicines Agency (EMA) for use in the European Union in 2011. The quadrivalent version was approved for use in the European Union in 2013.

, the only other company holding LAIV vaccine rights was BioDiem of Australia. BioDiem licensed rights to private production of the vaccine in China to Changchun BCHT Biotechnology, which also holds public rights for production in China sublicensed from the World Health Organization.  BCHT plans to market a trivalent LAIV vaccine for H1N1 flu by the end of 2016.  The BCHT flu vaccine is one of several candidates for WHO prequalification in the near future, reflecting a shift of Chinese market priorities from a large domestic market toward export. BioDiem has also licensed production to the Serum Institute of India, which holds exclusive licenses for production in Mexico, Argentina, Peru, South Africa, Bangladesh, Bhutan, Nepal, Pakistan and Sri Lanka, and the Government Pharmaceutical Organization of Thailand.
It was the first and  the only live attenuated vaccine for influenza available outside of Europe. In September 2009, a LAIV intranasal vaccine for the novel H1N1 influenza virus was approved. In 2011, the vaccine was approved by the European Medicines Agency (EMA) for use in the European Union under the brand name Fluenz.

AstraZeneca acquired MedImmune and subsequently retired the MedImmune name.

Research
The live attenuated influenza vaccine is designed to be quickly modifiable to present the surface antigens of seasonal flu.  The modifiability could also allow it to be quickly customized as a vaccine against a pandemic influenza if one were to emerge.  In light of the Global spread of H5N1 advance preparation to reduce human mortality in the event of an H5N1 pandemic has begun.  Modifying FluMist to serve as a specific human H5N1 vaccine is among the measures studied.

In June 2006, the National Institutes of Health (NIH) began enrolling participants in a Phase I H5N1 study of an intranasal influenza vaccine candidate based on MedImmune's live, attenuated vaccine technology.

In September 2006, the National Institute of Allergy and Infectious Diseases (NIAID) reported that inoculation with a live attenuated influenza vaccine modified to present the surface antigens of certain H5N1 variants provided broad protection against other H5N1 variants in the mouse and ferret models. Attenuated live viruses were found protective against H5N1 in mice and chickens in a 2009 study.

Although early work is focusing on the looming H5N1 threat, the CDC team led by Kanta Subbarao and others intends to eventually prepare and store surface antigens for all known strains of influenza, ready to be grafted onto the base attenuated FluMist core virus whenever a pandemic threat might emerge.

"Several trials have reported that LAIVs can boost virus-specific CTLs as well as mucosal and serum antibodies and provide broad cross-protection against heterologous human influenza A viruses."  (58, 59)  "[V]accine formulas inducing heterosubtypic T cell–mediated immunity may confer broad protection against avian and human influenza A viruses."

In September 2009, a live attenuated intranasal vaccine for the novel H1N1 influenza virus was approved.

References

External links 
 

2009 swine flu pandemic
AstraZeneca brands
Influenza vaccines
Live vaccines